CHGA-FM is a french language community radio station that operates at 97.3 FM in Maniwaki, Quebec, Canada.

Launched in 1980, the station is owned by Radio communautaire FM de la Haute-Gatineau.

The station is a member of the Association des radiodiffuseurs communautaires du Québec.

External links
www.chga.qc.ca
 

Hga
Hga
Hga
Radio stations established in 1980
1980 establishments in Quebec